Preben Arentoft (born 1 November 1942) is a Danish former football player who played in the midfielder position. He played professionally for a number of clubs, most notably Newcastle United and Blackburn Rovers. He played nine games for the Denmark national football team.

Biography
Born in Copenhagen, Arentoft started playing football with Copenhagen club Brønshøj Boldklub. He made his Danish national team debut in June 1965, and played four national team games while at Brønshøj.  He moved abroad to play professionally for Scottish club Greenock Morton.  Due to the Danish rules of amateurism, he was no longer eligible for the Danish national team.

In 1969, Arentoft moved to England to play for Newcastle United. He played for Newcastle until 1971, earning the nickname Benny. He made a total of 63 appearances for the club, scoring 3 goals. He helped Newcastle win the Inter-Cities Fairs Cup in 1969, scoring in the second leg of the final. This made him the first Danish football player to win a European cup title.  He is also remembered for having to play in goal during a 5-1 win over Manchester United in 1970, coming on for an injured Willie McFaul.

The rules of amateurism on the Danish national team was abandoned in 1971 before a game against Portugal. Preben Arentoft (representing Newcastle United) was picked, along with a handful of other players, to be the first professionals ever to participate on the national team. Denmark lost the game 5-0. He had another 4 caps that year to round up his career in the national team.

In 1971, he moved on to English club Blackburn Rovers, before ending his career with Helsingør IF.

References

External links 
 Danish national team profile

1942 births
Living people
Danish men's footballers
Danish expatriate men's footballers
Denmark international footballers
Newcastle United F.C. players
English Football League players
Scottish Football League players
Expatriate footballers in Scotland
Expatriate footballers in England
Greenock Morton F.C. players
Blackburn Rovers F.C. players
Association football midfielders
Brønshøj Boldklub players
Brønshøj BK managers
Danish football managers
Footballers from Copenhagen